Tom and Jerry: Santa's Little Helpers is a 2014 animated Direct-to-DVD special starring Tom and Jerry and the Christmas special of The Tom and Jerry Show, produced by Warner Bros. Animation.  It was made available as part of a 2-disc DVD set of the same name, which also contains 29 other Tom and Jerry cartoons and episodes from Tom and Jerry Tales, on October 7, 2014.

On August 13, 2020, it was announced that the film would be released on Blu-ray as paired with Tom and Jerry: A Nutcracker Tale on October 27, 2020.

Plot
Jerry and Tuffy are living the good life in Santa's workshop, until the unfortunate day on which Tom is rescued by the Claus family. With Tom in the house, merry mayhem ensues at the North Pole, but when the dust settles, the destructive duo now have to work together to save Christmas and learn the true meaning of friendship.

Voice Cast
 William Hanna as Tom & Jerry (archive audio; uncredited)
 Rich Danhakl as Tom & Jerry (uncredited)
 Kath Soucie as Tuffy
 Nickie Bryar as Cindy
 Mark Hamill as Santa
 Edie McClurg as Mrs. Clause
 Rick Zieff as Devil & Angel Tom
 Frank Welker as Jingles (uncredited)

Additional Voices
 Eric Bauza
 Tom Kenny

See also
 List of Christmas films
 Santa Claus in film

References

External links

2014 direct-to-video films
2014 films
Tom and Jerry films
Warner Bros. films
Warner Bros. direct-to-video animated films
American children's animated comedy films
American flash animated films
Warner Bros. Animation animated films
American Christmas films
Animated Christmas films
2010s American animated films
Animated direct-to-video specials
2000s children's animated films
2010s children's animated films
Santa Claus in film
2010s English-language films
Films directed by Darrell Van Citters